Major General Albert H. Wilkening (February 1, 1946 – April 8, 2020) was the adjutant general of Wisconsin from 2002 to 2007, when he was succeeded by Donald P. Dunbar. He was responsible for both the federal and state missions of the Wisconsin Army and Air National Guard and the Wisconsin Division of Emergency Management. In March 2003 Wilkening was appointed by Governor Jim Doyle to head a new Homeland Security Council in Wisconsin and to be the governor's homeland security advisor. He died of pancreatic cancer in 2020, at the age of 74.

Military career 
Wilkening enlisted in the United States Air Force in 1968 and was commissioned a second lieutenant on March 28 of that year. Following pilot training at Webb Air Force Base, Texas, he served as a flight training instructor at Columbus Air Force Base, Mississippi until May, 1973. In August, 1973, he joined the Wisconsin Air National Guard. He has served in a variety of command and staff positions, including as commander of the 176th Tactical Fighter Squadron and deputy commander for Operations, 128th Tactical Fighter Wing. From December, 1990 to August, 2002, he served as deputy adjutant general for air, and commander of the Wisconsin Air National Guard. He was named adjutant general by Governor Scott McCallum and assumed office on September 1, 2002. Wilkening was a command pilot with more than 3,300 flying hours in the T-41, T-37, T-38, O-2A, OA-37, and A-10 aircraft.

Education

Flight information

Awards and decorations

Other achievements 
Board of directors, National Guard Association

Effective dates of promotion

References 

1946 births
2020 deaths
Long Island University alumni
Adjutants General of Wisconsin
United States Air Force generals
Recipients of the Legion of Merit
Mississippi State University alumni
Air Command and Staff College alumni